Coop Norrbotten Arena is an indoor sporting arena located in Luleå, Sweden. The seating capacity of the arena is 6,150, and it is the home arena of the Luleå HF ice hockey team.

History

It was opened on 13 September 1970, and was called Delfinen ("The Dolphin") until 2002 when it was refurbished and the naming rights were sold to the local division of the Swedish retail company Kooperativa Förbundet, who renamed it Coop Arena. In 2010, it was renamed Coop Norrbotten Arena, although it's still occasionally referred to as "Coop Arena".

The arena hosted the first semi-final of Melodifestivalen 2011 on 5 February 2011, and hosted the third semi-final of Melodifestivalen 2020 on 15 February 2020.

See also
 List of indoor arenas in Sweden
 List of indoor arenas in Nordic countries

References

External links

 Coop Norrbotten Arena at Luleå HF's website
 Coop Norrbotten Arena at Luleå Municipality's website
 Hockeyarenas.net entry

Indoor ice hockey venues in Sweden
Ice hockey venues in Sweden
Sport in Luleå
Buildings and structures in Norrbotten County
1970 establishments in Sweden
Sports venues completed in 1970